The Realm is a southern California surfing products and clothing company co-founded in 1997 by noted surfers Mike Parsons and Pat O'Connell. It has sponsored pro surfers such as Tom Curren. The brand's ownership has changed twice since 1999 and is now is owned by Realm Holdings, LLC. www.realmnation.com

Between 2001 and 2006 The Realm brand name was licensed in the US to Anaheim, California-based Motiv Sports, best known for its pricepoint bicycles found in big-box stores like Target. The brand was also carried on molded surfboards from China at discount retailers such as Costco. Realm products can easily be found in sporting goods retailers, like Big 5 Sporting Goods. Products include, rash guards, boardshorts, Hoodies, T-shirts, sunglasses, beach cruiser bicycles and flipflops.

The Realm is known as a true Southern California Surf brand made "for surfers by surfers" and has used the tagline Three Oceans - One Realm since inception.

The Realm has licensees and distributors in North America, Europe, Japan, Slovenia, United Kingdom, and China.

External links
 Realm Nation website

Surfwear brands
Companies established in 1997